is a Japanese male professional volleyball player from Natori City, Miyagi Prefecture. Onodera sometimes served as Japan senior national team's captain. He currently plays in V.League for JT Thunders.

Personal life 
On April 3, 2022, he officially announced his marriage to his long-time girlfriend, through his social media account. Taishi Onodera revealed that his first son was given birth on his social media.

Clubs 
  Tohoku High School (2011–2014) 
  Tokai University (2014–2018)
  JT Thunders (2018–present)

Awards 
V.League Division One
 Season 2018-19: Best 6
 Season 2019-20: Best Blocker, Best Spiker, Best 6
 Season 2020-21: Best Blocker, Best 6
 Season 2021-22: Fair play award

See also
  at athleterecipe.com
  at 4years.asahi.com
  at 4years.asahi.com
  at 4years.asahi.com
  at 4years.asahi.com

References

1996 births
Living people
Japanese men's volleyball players
Sportspeople from Miyagi Prefecture
Tokai University alumni
Volleyball players at the 2020 Summer Olympics
Olympic volleyball players of Japan
Volleyball players at the 2018 Asian Games
Middle blockers
21st-century Japanese people